Lake Tuusula or Lake Tuusulanjärvi is a lake on the border of the municipalities of  Tuusula and Järvenpää in Southern Finland. The lake has an area of 6.0 square kilometres. Since the beginning of the twentieth century the shores of Lake Tuusula has been an artist's colony. The houses of Jean Sibelius, Juhani Aho, Pekka Halonen, Eero Järnefelt, Joonas Kokkonen and Aleksis Kivi are on the edges of the lake.

The Lake Tuusulanjärvi Water Protection Association has taken action to save the lake from eutrophication effects since the early 1970s. Apart from wintertime water aeration and cyprinid fish removal,  some additional water is being fed into the Lake via the Päijänne Water Tunnel.

References

External links
 

Järvenpää
Landforms of Uusimaa
Vantaa River basin
Lakes of Tuusula